The FBI–King suicide letter or blackmail package was an anonymous 1964 letter and package by the Federal Bureau of Investigation (FBI) meant to blackmail Martin Luther King Jr. The suicide letter was part of the FBI's COINTELPRO operation against King.

History
On November 21, 1964, a package that contained the letter and a tape recording allegedly of King's sexual indiscretions was delivered to King's address. Although the letter was anonymously written, Martin Luther King Jr. correctly suspected the FBI sent the package. Coretta Scott King said the tapes comprised only "mumbo jumbo". The letter does not specify precisely what action it is urging King to undertake; King understood the letter as advocating that he commit suicide, although some have suggested that it was merely urging him to decline the Nobel Peace Prize (which he won in 1964) or step out of leadership.

On March 8, 1971, an activist group called the Citizens' Commission to Investigate the FBI burglarized a local office of the FBI in Media, Pennsylvania, and stole classified documents. Part of those documents revealed a secret FBI operation called COINTELPRO. Those documents were later sent to newspapers and members of the United States Congress. During the Church Committee hearings and investigations in 1975, a copy of the "suicide letter" was discovered in the work files of William C. Sullivan, deputy FBI director. He has been suggested as its author. Once the surveillance tapes of King were publicly revealed, Bernard Lee and the Southern Christian Leadership Conference (SCLC) sought to have tapes gained by wiretaps destroyed in a lawsuit. Their request was denied by United States District Court for the District of Columbia judge John Lewis Smith Jr. He ordered all tapes sealed until the year 2027 and placed into the National Archives and Records Administration.

Since 1977, attempts have been made to release the recordings in the United States Congress. Republican Senator Jesse Helms from North Carolina in 1983 sought to reveal information about King in order to undermine the establishment of Martin Luther King Jr. Day. The Martin Luther King Jr. Records Collection bill, which would designate King government files for "presumption of immediate disclosure", was introduced in Congress by Democratic Representative Cynthia McKinney from Georgia in 2002 and 2005, by Democratic Senator John Kerry from Massachusetts in 2006, and by Democratic Representative John Lewis from Georgia in 2010, but never passed by Congress.

A copy of the letter is known to exist in J. Edgar Hoover's confidential files at the National Archives.

See also
Civil Rights Movement
SEXINT
MLK/FBI

References

Notes

Footnotes

Works cited

Further reading

External links

1964 documents
Civil rights movement
Blackmail
Coretta Scott King
Federal Bureau of Investigation operations
Martin Luther King Jr.
Federal Bureau of Investigation controversies
Federal Bureau of Investigation misconduct
Works about suicide